Daytona refers to the city of Daytona Beach, Florida, or things named after it.

Daytona may also refer to:

Locations
 Daytona Beach Shores, Florida
 South Daytona, Florida
 The Daytona Beach metropolitan area
 Halifax area, also known as Daytona, the region around Daytona Beach

Motor racing
 Daytona Beach and Road Course
 Daytona International Speedway, a NASCAR speedway, which hosts:
 Daytona 500, a NASCAR race
 Daytona 200, a motorcycle race
 24 Hours of Daytona, a sports car race
 Daytona Prototypes, a race car type used in the Daytona 24
 Daytona Motorsport, a UK-based karting organisation

Automobiles
 Shelby Daytona
 Ferrari Daytona
 Dodge Daytona
 Dodge Charger Daytona
 Alfa Romeo Daytona
 Studebaker Daytona

Motorcycles
 Triumph Daytona 650
 Triumph Daytona 675
 Triumph Daytona 955i

Wristwatches
 TAG Heuer Daytona
 Rolex Daytona

Other
 Daytona database, a database management system produced by AT&T
 Campagnolo Daytona, a group of mid-range racing bicycle parts now called Centaur
 Daytona, a song by Chris Rea from his 1989 album, The Road to Hell, about the Ferrari model mentioned above
 Daytona (album), an album by American rapper Pusha T
 Daytona USA, a 1994 racing game by Sega